The San Marino national under-21 football team represents the under-21s of San Marino in the UEFA U-21 Championship, and is controlled by the San Marino Football Federation (FSGC), the governing body of football of the state.

San Marino national under-21 football team competed for the first time in the qualifications for the 1990 UEFA European Under-21 Football Championship. Since then they missed two qualifying tournaments (2000 and 2002). Until 2015 qualifying they won only two matches, both by forfeit. In the 2004 qualifying they lost 6–0 to Sweden but UEFA later awarded the match as a 3–0 forfeit win to San Marino due to Sweden including suspended players in their squad. In the preliminary round of the 2007 qualifying they lost 2–1 to Armenia but UEFA also awarded the match as a 3–0 forfeit win for San Marino. In June 2012, they held Greece to a goalless draw in the 2013 qualifying. On 6 September 2013, San Marino recorded their first competitive win 1–0 over Wales at Stadio Olimpico in the 2015 qualifying. This was also the first competitive victory of any San Marino national team since a 2–1 under-17 victory against Andorra in 2002.

Competitive record

UEFA European Under-21 Championship

UEFA European Under-21 Football Championship

2023 UEFA European Under-21 Championship qualification

Current squad
 The following players were called up for the 2023 UEFA European Under-21 Championship qualification matches.
 Match dates: 2 and 7 June 2022.
 Opposition:  and Caps and goals correct as of:''' 29 March 2022, after the match against .

See also
San Marino national football team

References

External links
San Marino Under-21 at uefa.com

European national under-21 association football teams
Under 21